Manohar Lal Kampani was the first lieutenant governor of Andaman and Nicobar Islands. He served from 12 November 1982 to 3 December 1985.

Early life
He was born in town named Gujarat of pre-partition Punjab to Nathuram Kampani and Vidyawanti Kampani.

Career
He started his career as Commissioned Army officer where he was mentioned in despatches and also attended the Defence Services Staff College, Wellington. Later  he joined the Administrative services. 

As an officer of Administrative service he served  as Deputy Commissioner in Kohima and Imphal, Development Commissioner of Sikkim, Chief Commissioner of Manipur and Chief Secretary of Arunachal Pradesh in a distinguished career.

In the Central assignments , he served as Joint Secretary  and then as Additional Secretary in Home Ministry of India. He was the home Ministry expert in affairs of the North-East India. He played significant role in various Accords and talks in North-East including Nagaland, Mizoram and Assam during his tenure.

Shillong Accord 1975
As Joint Secretary in Home Ministry he was instrumental in drafting the Shillong Accord of 1975 with Nagaland Peace Council and Nagaland underground.

The Indian government was represented by Lallan Prasad Singh, Governor of Nagaland. The governor was assisted by M L Kampani , who as Joint Secretary in the Ministry of Home Affairs (MHA), was the Home ministry's point man for North -East and by two advisors for Nagaland— M. Ramunny and H. Zopianga. This historic agreement was signed at Shillong, Meghalaya, on 11 November 1975.

Mizo Accord 1976
He played a key role in signing of Mizo Accord in February 1976. The Mizo leader Mr Laldenga and his team of Mizo National Front (MNF)held discussions with Home Secretary Mr Sundar Lal Khurana, Lt Governor of Mizoram Mr S K Chibber and Mr M L Kampani, Joint Secretary in Ministry of Home representing Government of India in February 1976. The main terms of the Accord were signed on 18 Feb 1976.

Lieutenant governor
In 1982 he became the first Lieutenant Governor succeeding S. L. Sharma who was last Chief Commissioner  of Andaman and Nicobar Islands.

He was instrumental in many early developmental projects in Andaman and Nicobar Islands including Andaman Trunk Road.

Other
He was part of the Home Ministry team which was with the then Prime Minister Morarji Desai when the aircraft was involved in a mishap at Jorhat on 4 November 1977.

Later life
He was active with Charitable trusts and corporate entities in later life. A keen sportsman he played tennis well into his 80s.

He shared his experience with many writers  and journalists on his time in North-East India.

He died on 22 April 2021, in New Delhi, at age of 96.

See also
 Shillong Accord of 1975
 List of lieutenant governors of the Andaman and Nicobar Islands

References 

 https://www.rakshaknews.in/en/special-en/eye-opening-experience-for-police-chief-at-bompuka-island-of-nicobar/
 https://www.andamanchronicle.net/index.php?option=com_content&view=article&id=4721:first-lt-governor-of-ani-ml-kampani-visits-islands&catid=37&Itemid=142
 https://publishing.cdlib.org/ucpressebooks/view?docId=ft8r29p2r8;chunk.id=d0e36;doc.view=print
 https://peacemaker.un.org/sites/peacemaker.un.org/files/IN_751111_Shillong%20Agreement_0.pdf
 http://cdpsindia.org/shillong-accord/
 https://imphalwest.nic.in/history-of-deputy-commissioner/
 https://www.andamansheekha.com/93334/
 http://www.andamansheekha.com/24153/
 https://kohima.nagaland.gov.in/DC%20KOHIMA.htm
 https://indianarmy.nic.in/Site/FormTemplete/frmTempSimple.aspx?MnId=L/B7tyYtYP3nOgi9xpNBhA==&ParentID=QnkbcH1Im60j1dfj/8aU/A==
 https://rcportblair.rotaryindia.org/AboutUs.aspx
 https://easternmirrornagaland.com/solution-without-integration/
 https://www.arunachalpradesh.gov.in/chief-secretary
 https://nagalandpage.com/who-convened-naga-people-convention/
 Encyclopaedia of North-East India: Mizoram by Hamlet Bareh
 Mizoram The Dagger Brigade by Nirmal Nibedon
 Sikkim Herald – Volume 13
Lok Sabha Debates – Page 175 India. Parliament. Lok Sabha · 1979 
Challenge to India's Unity: Assam Students' Agitation and ... – Page 139books.google.co.uk › books D.P Kumar
 

1925 births
2021 deaths
Indian Administrative Service officers
Lieutenant governors of the Andaman and Nicobar Islands
People from New Delhi
Punjabi people
Indian Army officers
Defence Services Staff College alumni